This is a list of programs currently, formerly, and soon to be broadcast by Venevisión (made by Venevisión only).

Current programming

Telenovelas

Programming

Shows

News programs
 El Informador (1973–1993, 2002–2006)
 Noticiero Venevisión (1994–2001, 2006–present)
 Frente a la Prensa (1961–1967)
 Conversaciones con Alfredo Peña (1994–1999)
 Así son las Cosas (1994–2007)
 24 Horas (1990–2004)
 El Viva (1987–1991, 1998–2002)
Close Up (1981–1989; 2010–present)

Telenovela/drama

 En el mar la vida es más sabrosa (2015)
 Amor Secreto (2015)
 Corazón esmeralda (2014)
 Cosita Linda (2014)
 De todas maneras Rosa (2013)
 El Talismán (2012)
 Corazón Apasionado (2012)
 Mi ex me tiene ganas (2012)
 El árbol de Gabriel (2012)
 Válgame Dios (2012)
 Natalia del Mar (2011)
 La viuda joven (2011)
 Sacrificio de Mujer (2011)
 Eva Luna (2010)
 La mujer perfecta (2010)
 Harina de Otro Costal (2010)
 Tomasa Tequiero (2009)
 Un Esposo para Estela (2009)
 Los misterios del amor (2009)
 Alma Indomable (2009)
 Pobre Millonaria (2008)
 La vida entera (2008–2009)
 ¿Vieja Yo? (2008–2009)
 Valeria (2008)
 Torrente (2008)
 Arroz con Leche (2007–2008)
 Somos Tú y Yo (2007–2010)
 Amor Comprado (2007-2008)
 Aunque mal paguen (2007–2008)
 Acorralada (2007)
 Voltea pa' que te enamores (2006–2007)
 Ciudad Bendita (2006–2007)
 Olvidarte Jamás (2006)
 Los Querendones (2006)
 Con Toda el Alma (2005–2006)
 Mi Vida Eres Tú (2005)
 Soñar no Cuesta Nada (2005)
 El amor las vuelve locas (2005)
 Se Solicita Principe Azul (2005)
 Nunca te Dire Adios (2005)
 Ángel Rebelde (2004)
 Sabor a ti (2004–2005)
 Amor del Bueno (2004)
 Rebeca (2003)
 Todo Sobre Camila (2003)
 Engañada (2003)
 Bésame Tonto (2003)
 Cosita Rica (2003–2004)
 Las González (2002)
 Gata Salvaje (2002–2003)
 Lejana Como el Viento (2002)
 Mambo y Canela (2002)
 Felina (2001)
 Cazando a un Millonario (2001)
 Guerra de Mujeres (2001–2002)
 Mas que Amor... Frenesi (2001)
 Secreto de amor (2001)
 Maria Rosa, Buscame una Esposaa (2000)
 Vidas Prestadas (2000)
 Hechizo de Amor (2000)
 Muñeca de trapo (2000)
 Amantes de Luna Llena (2000–2001)
 Vuleve Junto a Mi (2000)
 Calypso (1999)
 Cuando Hay Pasion (1999)
 El País de las mujeres (1999–2000)
 Enamorada (1999)
 Toda Mujer (1999)
 Jugando A Ganar (1998)
 Asi es la Vida (1998)
 Enseñame un Querer (1998)
 La Mujer de mi Vida (1998)
 Samantha (1998)
 Entre Tu y Yo (1997)
 A todo corazón (1997–1998)
 Destino de Mujer (1997)
 Contra viento y marea (1997)
 Amor Mío (1997)
 Todo Por Tu Amor (1997)
 Sol de Tentación (1996)
 Quirpa de Tres Mujeres (1996)
 El Perdón De Los Pecados (1996)
 Pecado de Amor (1995)
 Dulce Enemiga (1995)
 Ka Ina (1995)
 Como tú, ninguna (1994)
 Maria Celeste (1994)
 Peligrosa (1994)
 Morena Clara (1993)
 Rosangelica (1993)
 Amor de Papel (1993)
 Por Amarte Tanto (1993)
 Amor Sin Fronteras (1992)
 Cara Sucia (1992)
 Macarena (1992)
 Bellisima (1991)
 Ines Duarte, Secretaria (1991)
 La Mujer Prohibida (1991)
 Mundo de Fieras (1991)
 Adorable Mónica (1990)
 La Revancha (1990)
 Pasionaria (1990)
 Fabiola (1989)
 Maribel (1989)
 Paraíso (1989)
 La Sombra de Piera (1989)
 Alba Marina (1988)
 Amor de Abril (1988)
 Niña Bonita (1988)
 Mi Nombre es Amor (1987)
 Y Tambien la Luna (1987)
 Maria Jose, Oficios del hogar (1986)
 Las Amazonas (1985)
 Cantare Para Ti (1985)
 El Sol Sale Para Todos (1985)
 Nacho (1984)
 Sueño Contigo (1984)
 Diana Carolina (1983)
 Ligia Elena (1983)
 Sorangel (1982)
 Querida Mama (1982)
 Maria Fernanda (1981)
 La Heredera (1981)
 Buenos Días, Isabel (1980)
 Mi mejor Amiga (1980)
 Emilia (1979)
 Rosangela (1979)
 Ana María (1979)
 Daniela (1978)
 María del Mar (1978)
 Rafaela (1977)
 La Zulianita (1977)
 Laura y Virginia (1977)
 Cumbres Borrascosas (1976)
 Balumba (1976)
 Una Muchacha llamada Milagros (1974)
 Mariana de la Noche (1976) (Mexican version of Mariana de la Noche on Televisa in 2003)
 La Señorita Elena (1975)
 Peregrina (1973)
 Maria Teresa (1972)
 Esmeralda (1970)
 Rosario (1968)
 La Muñeca Brava (1967)
 Tormenta (1967)

Reality
 Cuanto Vale el Show (1998–2001)

Sitcom
 Casos y Cosas de Casa (1961–1975)

Variety
 Valores Humanos (1967–1982)
 De Fiesta con Venevision (1969–1982)
 (Super) Sabado Sensacional (1972–present)
 Sopotocientos (1972–1974)
 Humor con Joselo (1972–1979, 1982–1993)
 Bienvenidos (1982–2001)
 Giros TV (1992–1997)
 Cheverísimo (1992–2002)
 El Club de Los Tigritos (1994–1999)
 Confidencias (1996–2004; 2011-2012)
 Maite (1997–2001)
 Viviana a la Medianoche (1999–2001)
 Rugemania (1999–2001)
 La Magica Aventura de Oscar (2000)
 ¡Qué Locura! (2001-2015)
 ¡Que Mujeres! (2001–2003)
 Marta Susana (2001–2007)
 Atomico (2001–2006; 2014–present)
 Salvese Quien Pueda (2003–2008)
 Cual es La Solución (2005–2009)
 Erika Tipo 11 (2012-2013)

Game show
 Match 4 (1986–1988)
 Mega Match (1996–2006)
 La Fiebre del Dinero (2001)
 Que Dice La Gente (2001–2002)
 Todo por Venezuela (2004–2006)
 El Gran Navegante (2007–2009)
  La guerra de los Sexos (2000-2013)

Kids' programs
 El Club de Los Tigritos (1994-2000)
 Juana la Iguana (1998-2003)
 Plaza Sésamo (1982–present)

News Events

Sports Events

Soccer 
 FIFA World Cup 
 FIFA Under-20 World Cup
 FIFA Under-17 World Cup 
 FIFA Women's World Cup 
 FIFA U-20 Women's World Cup
 FIFA U-17 Women's World Cup
 FIFA Confederations Cup

Tennis 
 ATP World Tour Masters 1000 
 ATP World Tour 500

Basketball

Volleyball

Handball

Rugby

Futsal

Baseball

Motor Sports

Music Events

References 

Venevision
Programs broadcast by Venevision